Uvarovsky (masculine), Uvarovskaya (feminine), or Uvarovskoye (neuter) is the name of several rural localities in Russia:
Uvarovsky, Tambov Oblast, a settlement in Troitsky Selsoviet of Muchkapsky District of Tambov Oblast
Uvarovsky, Volgograd Oblast, a khutor in Khoperopionersky Selsoviet of Uryupinsky District of Volgograd Oblast
Uvarovskoye, Kaluga Oblast, a village in Borovsky District of Kaluga Oblast
Uvarovskoye, Stavropol Krai, a selo in Russky Selsoviet of Kursky District of Stavropol Krai
Uvarovskaya, Kirov Oblast, a village in Pashinsky Rural Okrug of Afanasyevsky District of Kirov Oblast
Uvarovskaya, Vologda Oblast, a village in Seredsky Selsoviet of Totemsky District of Vologda Oblast